The Llobregat–Anoia Line is an unconnected metre gauge railway line linking Barcelona with the Baix Llobregat, Bages and Anoia regions, in Catalonia, Spain. Its name refers to the fact that it follows the course of the Llobregat and Anoia rivers for most of its length. Plaça d'Espanya station serves as the Barcelona terminus of the line, then continuing northwards to Martorell, where two main branches to Manresa and Igualada are formed.

Barcelona Metro line 8, together with a number of commuter and freight rail services, runs on the line's main route between Barcelona and Sant Boi de Llobregat. The section between Barcelona and Olesa de Montserrat is operated as a high-frequency commuter rail system known as Baix Llobregat Metro, with some services continuing northwards to Manresa and Igualada. This system further includes the temporarily closed Olesa de Montserrat–Esparreguera Cable Car, which is also operated by FGC. The Llobregat–Anoia Line is part of the Autoritat del Transport Metropolità (ATM) fare-integrated public transport system for the Barcelona metropolitan area.

History
The Llobregat–Anoia Line originated from three formerly separate narrow gauge railway lines: Tranvía o Ferrocarril Económico de Manresa a Berga (opened in 1885), Ferrocarril Central Catalán (opened in 1893) and Camino de Hierro del Nordeste de España, built to quickly and cheaply give passenger and freight transportation to the rapidly industrialising Llobregat area. The Metro del Baix Llobregat designation was first introduced on this line in 2000, and the line 8 service has been formally included in the Barcelona Metro network since 6 November 2003.

Development plans

In January 2017, the Catalan government approved a plan to extend the Llobregat–Anoia line from Plaça d'Espanya through the city as far as Gràcia station, also stopping at Hospital Clínic and Francesc Macià station, thereby linking with the Barcelona–Vallès Line, at an estimated cost of over €300 million. A second phase is also being considered to extend the line towards the Besòs station in the eastern part of the city.

List of stations
The following table lists the name of each station on the Llobregat–Anoia Line in order from south to north; a photo of the current station; the rail services operating at the station (L8, S33, S4, S8, R5, R50, R6 and/or R60); the date the current station was opened; the municipality or the city district (in the case of Barcelona) in which each station is located; the fare zone each station belongs to according to the Autoritat del Transport Metropolità (ATM) fare-integrated public transport system; remarkable notes about the station, including clarifications, additional information and a location map; and usage figures.

See also
 Ferrocarrils de la Generalitat de Catalunya
 Barcelona Metro
 Olesa de Montserrat–Esparreguera Cable Car
 Montserrat Rack Railway
 Montserrat Cable Car
 Barcelona–Vallès Line

Maps

Pl. Espanya – 
Magòria-La Campana– 
Ildefons Cerdà – 
Europa  Fira – 
Gornal – 
Sant Josep – 
L'Hospitalet Av. Carrilet – 
Almeda – 
Cornellà Riera – 
Sant Boi – 
Molí Nou-Ciutat Cooperativa – 
Colònia Güell – 
Santa Coloma de Cervelló – 
Sant Vicenç dels Horts – 
Can Ros – 
Quatre Camins– 
Pallejà – 
Sant Andreu de la Barca – 
El Palau – 
Martorell Vila  Castellbisbal – 
Martorell Central – 
Martorell Enllaç – 
Abrera – 
Olesa de Montserrat – 
Aeri de Montserrat – 
Monistrol de Montserrat – 
Castellbell i el Vilar – 
Sant Vicenç  Castellgalí – 
Manresa Viladordis – 
Manresa Alta – 
Manresa Baixador – 
Sant Esteve Sesrovires – 
La Beguda – 
Can Parellada – 
Masquefa – 
Piera – 
Vallbona d'Anoia – 
Capellades – 
La Pobla de Claramunt – 
Vilanova del Camí – 
Igualada –

Notes

References

Bibliography

External links

 Ferrocarrils de la Generalitat de Catalunya (FGC) official website
 Llobregat–Anoia Line at trenscat.cat 

 
Barcelona Metro lines
Ferrocarrils de la Generalitat de Catalunya
Railway lines in Catalonia
Metre gauge railways in Spain
Transport in Anoia
Rail transport in Barcelona
Transport in L'Hospitalet de Llobregat
Transport in Cornellà de Llobregat
Transport in Sant Boi de Llobregat
Transport in Sants-Montjuïc
Transport in Baix Llobregat
Transport in Bages
Railway lines opened in 1881
Railway lines opened in 1893
Railway lines opened in 1912
1881 establishments in Spain